Frizzled-10 (Fz-10) is a protein that in humans is encoded by the FZD10 gene. Fz-10 has also been designated as CD350 (cluster of differentiation 350).

Function 

This gene is a member of the frizzled gene family. Members of this family encode 7-transmembrane domain proteins that are receptors for the Wingless type MMTV integration site family of signaling proteins. Most frizzled receptors are coupled to the beta-catenin canonical signaling pathway. Using array analysis, expression of this intronless gene is significantly up-regulated in two cases of primary colon cancer.

References

Further reading

External links 
 
 

Clusters of differentiation
G protein-coupled receptors